Al-Sawfah is a sub-district located in the Al Haymah Al Kharijiyah District, Sana'a Governorate, Yemen. Al-Sawfah had a population of 513 according to the 2004 census.

References 

Sub-districts in Al Haymah Al Kharijiyah District